Foreign Devils is an original novella written by Andrew Cartmel and based on the long-running British science fiction television series Doctor Who. It features the Second Doctor and Jamie and Zoe as well as fictional psychic detective Carnacki.

Summary
The story begins in China, 1800, when the Doctor and his companions arrive in their time machine, the TARDIS, at the English Trade Concession in Canton. A relic, previously thought harmless becomes active and transports his companions into the future. The Doctor tracks them in the TARDIS and materialises in England, 1900, where the descendants of an English merchant from 1800 have gathered. One of these is a man called Carnacki, who before long helps the Doctor investigate a series of strange murders in the house. When the Doctor discovers that the house and its surroundings have literally been removed from space and time, he realises that their attacker may not be all they seem.

Background
It was released both as a standard edition hardback, a deluxe edition featuring a frontispiece by Mike Collins, and a paperback edition. The hardback editions have a foreword by Mike Ashley. It features a crossover with the William Hope Hodgson Carnacki character, whose copyright had lapsed into the public domain.

David J. Howe, at that time editor of this range of novels, explained "Andrew [Cartmel] suggested using... Carnacki, a psychic investigator created by writer William Hope Hodgson back in 1909, who featured in several short stories written by Hodgson, six of which were collected as Carnacki The Ghost Finder in 1913... We looked into the rights situation and found that all Hodgson’s work is now out of copyright, so without any difficulty in that regard Andrew was able to incorporate the character into the Doctor Who universe..." The novella included a reprint of one of Hodgson's original Carnacki's short stories.

External links
The Cloister Library - Foreign Devils

Fiction set in 1800
Fiction set in 1900
2002 British novels
2002 science fiction novels
Doctor Who novellas
Novels by Andrew Cartmel
British science fiction novels
Telos Publishing books